Yes, You Are Ferocious is an American experimental rock band formed by Adam Smith, musician, in 2001.  While Y,YAF was nomadic in nature, the collective was initially founded in Sacramento, CA, later relocated to Long Beach, CA, & finally in Portland OR, where it signed with Allalom Music and later disbanded in 2010.  
All of Y,YAF's recordings were self-released, with the exception of A Gold Heart for the Melody (Velvet Blue Music, 2004), The Habit Rode Me Home & Shall We All Go for Burritos? (bIGFATMAYbe, 2005), Sno Suit (Allalom Music, Establishing the Anti-Establishment, 2007), The Effects of Nuclear Weapons EP (Allalom Music, 2008) & Y,YAF EP (Allalom Music/ARR, 2009).  
Y,YAF's sound is often referred to as freak folk, psychedelic folk or noise pop.  Songs were always recorded in a modular, analog format, utilizing dozens of cassette recorders and broken four tracks.  The productions were most commonly recorded in odd, small spaces such as walk-in closets, bathrooms, wood sheds, and Smith's wagon.  Smith played most all instruments on recordings, with the exception of Valdas Karalis, Vincent Reyes, Ikey Owens, and Orlando Greenhill.  Although Y,YAF was a constantly rotating cast of live/touring members, it most notably and recently included: RC Hampton (No More Train Ghosts) & Samuel Aaron Thomas (Seven Dynasties of Glass Children).

Discography

LP's
You Are an Animal Cracker (2001, limited cassette-only self-release, out of print)
The New Dictionary (2003, limited cassette-only self-release, out of print)
What Makes It Science Fiction When You Fall from OH SO High Above? (2004, bIGFATMAYbe music, limited CD, out of print)
Do Nothing Out of Order (2006, bIGFATMAYbe music, limited CD, out of print)

EP's
DON'T BLAME NASA (2004, bIGFATMAYbe music, limited hand-printed lino-block covers, out of print)
Soon (recorded live at Koo's, Long Beach CA)  (2005, self-released, limited CD, out of print)
The Holiday (2005, limited cassette & CD self-release, hand-printed lino-block covers, out of print)
Set Sail, Sad One/Thanksgiving's The Shit (2006, bIGFATMAYbe music, limited CD, out of print)
How I Failed In Front of You People (recorded live at Dunes, Portland OR) (2006, limited cassette-only self-release, out of print)
The Effects of Nuclear Weapons (2008, Allalom Music)
Y,YAF EP (2009, Allalom Music/ARR, tour-only release, out of print)

Compilations
"A Gold Heart for the Melody" Start the Music (2004, Velvet Blue Music)
"The Habit Rode Me Home" bIGFATMAYbe vol. 1 (2005, bIGFATMAYbe music)
"Shall We All Go for Burritos? (Soon)" bIGFATMAYbe vol. 1 (2005, bIGFATMAYbe music)
"Sno Suit" Establishing the Anti-Establishment (2007, Allalom Music)

Video
Cocked (sndtk) (2003)
Hummanahummana (Soon, live in the East Village, Long Beach, CA) (2004, limited release, hand-printed lino-block artwork, out of print)
On My Peninsula (a tour documentary by Aaron Chervenak)  (2006)

References

External links 
 http://www.myspace.com/yesyouareferocious
 http://www.allalom.com

American experimental musical groups